Lajos Palágyi (15 April 1866 – 7 March 1933), born Lázár Silberstein, was a Hungarian poet, journalist, and educator. His poems often dealt with Jewish themes.

Biography
Born in Becse to Jewish parents Rozália (Reizel) and Mór (Moshe) Silberstein, he was educated privately by his father, a former public school-teacher, and by his elder brother Menachem (later known as Melchior Palágyi). He began to write at the age of thirteen, his first poem appearing in 1879 in  Magyar Népbarát. In recognition of his services to the Hungarian language he was appointed professor at the State Teachers' Seminary for women at Budapest.

Palagyi was involved in the effort which resulted in the official recognition of Judaism in Hungary in 1895. Following the 1918–1920 Hungarian revolution, he was expelled from the Petőfi Society and deprived of his pension because of his past associations with socialism. He lived a reclusive life in his final years.

Partial bibliography
 
 
 
 
  A philosophical poem.
 
 
  A tragedy which won the prize of the Hungarian Academy.

References
 

1866 births
1933 deaths
19th-century Hungarian educators
19th-century Hungarian Jews
19th-century Hungarian poets
20th-century Hungarian educators
20th-century Hungarian Jews
20th-century Hungarian poets
Hungarian journalists
Jewish educators
Jewish Hungarian writers
Jewish Hungarian-language writers
Jewish journalists
Jewish poets
People from Bečej